Adam S. Kovacs (born 3 February 1981 in Budapest, Hungary) is a Hungarian karateka.

He won the gold medal in the men's kumite 65 kg event at the 2009 World Games held in Kaohsiung, Taiwan. Adam S. Kovacs serves as the League President of Karate Combat since 2020. 

Kovács won gold medal at the 2005 Maccabiah Games.

Results

References

 Karate records, http://www.karaterec.com/en/competitors/adam-kovacs/

External links
 
 www.skovacs.hu

1981 births
Living people
Hungarian male karateka
World Games gold medalists
Competitors at the 2009 World Games
Competitors at the 2005 World Games
World Games medalists in karate
Maccabiah Games gold medalists for Hungary
20th-century Hungarian people
21st-century Hungarian people